Oumou Traoré (born 10 October 1969) is a Malian athlete. She competed in the women's discus throw at the 1996 Summer Olympics.

References

External links
 

1969 births
Living people
Athletes (track and field) at the 1996 Summer Olympics
Malian female discus throwers
Olympic athletes of Mali
Place of birth missing (living people)
21st-century Malian people